Andreas Højsleth, better known as Xyp9x, is a Danish professional Counter-Strike: Global Offensive player for Astralis. He became the first (along with three of his teammates) to win 4 majors in CS:GO, and to win 3 majors consecutively.

Højsleth was born and raised in Aars,  North Denmark Region. He is currently a member of Astralis. He is a former member of Team Solomid and Team Dignitas. The name Xyp9x was conceived by typing random keys on his keyboard. He was voted the 13th best CS:GO player of 2017 and 2018 by HLTV.org.

References

People from Vesthimmerland Municipality
Living people
Danish esports players
Counter-Strike players
Astralis players
Team SoloMid players
Dignitas (esports) players
Fnatic players
1995 births